The village of Bourne is a census-designated place (CDP) in the town of Bourne in Barnstable County, Massachusetts, United States. The population was 1,418 at the 2010 census, out of 19,754 in the town of Bourne as a whole.

Geography
Bourne is located at  (41.735027, -70.6128).

Demographics

As of the census of 2000, there were 1,443 people, 663 households, and 422 families residing in the CDP. The population density was 323.9/km2 (839.5/mi2). There were 946 housing units at an average density of 212.4/km2 (550.4/mi2). The racial makeup of the CDP was 98.66% White, 0.28% Black or African American, 0.18% Native American, 0.42% Asian, 0.17% from other races, and 0.49% from two or more races. Hispanic or Latino of any race were 0.59% of the population.

There were 663 households, out of which 22.3% had children under the age of 18 living with them, 81.3% were married couples living together, 2.7% had a female householder with no husband present, and 31.3% were non-families. 30.6% of all households were made up of individuals, and 12.5% had someone living alone who was 65 years of age or older. The average household size was 2.18 and the average family size was 2.70.

In the CDP, the population was spread out, with 18.3% under the age of 18, 4.4% from 18 to 24, 24.4% from 25 to 44, 29.3% from 45 to 64, and 23.6% who were 65 years of age or older. The median age was 47 years. For every 100 females, there were 90.6 males. For every 100 females age 18 and over, there were 89.5 males.

The median income for a household in the CDP was $104,830, and the median income for a family was $160,417. Males had a median income of $88,661 versus $62,981 for females. The per capita income for the CDP was $83,055. About 0.2% of families and 0.4% of the population were below the poverty line, including 0.3% of those under age 18 and 0.6% of those age 65 or over.

References

Bourne, Massachusetts
Census-designated places in Barnstable County, Massachusetts
Census-designated places in Massachusetts
Populated coastal places in Massachusetts